Kuya (Kouya, Kowya) is a Kru language of Ivory Coast.  The language was first put in written form in the 1980s.

References

Bété languages
Languages of Ivory Coast